Penny Clark (born 7 May 1975) is a British sailor who competed in the 2008 Summer Olympics.

References

External links 
 
 
 
 

1975 births
Living people
British female sailors (sport)
Olympic sailors of Great Britain
Sailors at the 2008 Summer Olympics – Laser Radial